Waltham Forest is the birthplace of William Morris, best known as one of the principal founders of the British Arts and Crafts Movement. Morris was a designer of wallpaper and patterned fabrics, a writer of poetry and fiction, and a pioneer of the socialist movement in Britain.

Other famous people such as Footballer and former England Captain David Beckham, I, Claudius star Derek Jacobi, former Essex and England Cricket Captain Graham Gooch and film director and producer Alfred Hitchcock were also born in the borough.

Among those who were born in the London Borough of Waltham Forest, or have dwelt within the borders of the modern borough are (alphabetical order):

List

 Naomi Ackie, actress
 Patrick Agyemang 
 Damon Albarn  
 Keith Albarn, manager of Soft Machine and father of Damon Albarn, taught art at Walthamstow College of Art in the 1960s
 Jodi Albert, former Hollyoaks actress
 Richard Ayoade
 Danny Bailey
 David Bailey
 Trevor Bailey, Essex and England cricketer
 Jill Barklem
 Robert Barltrop 
 Graham Barnfield, pundit and academic, moved to Highams Park in 2001. He lived in the former home of actress Tara Moran.
 David Beckham, grew up in Chingford having been born at Whipps Cross Hospital in Leytonstone on 2 May 1975; as a child he attended Chingford School and played football for Ridgeway Rovers, a local side
 Steve Bell
 John Berger, socialist artist and writer, lived in Highams Park as a child
 Peter Blake (artist), artist, painted sleeve cover of the Beatles Sgt. Peppers Lonely Hearts Club Band
 Blazin' Squad, members of the band lived in or near Highams Park and studied at Highams Park School
 Paul Boateng
 Mick Box, guitarist for Uriah Heep born in Walthamstow
 Boy Kill Boy
 Matthew Bourne, choreographer and dancer, was born in Walthamstow
 Frederick Bremer, inventor
 Sir Reader William Bullard
 Lee Butcher, Leyton Orient Goalkeeper
 Edward Buxton (conservationist)
 David Cairns, musician, guitarist with Secret Affair was born in Walthamstow
 Cartrain 
 Maurice Chambers
 Cornelius Cardew
 Harry Cohen, MP for Leyton, attended Selwyn School
 Terry Coldwell
 Terry Cole
 Phil Collen, lead guitarist of Def Leppard
 Jack Cornwell VC, born in Leyton in 1900
 Fanny Cradock  
 Bobby Crush
 Sir John Dankworth, jazz musician, born in Highams Park in 1927, attended Selwyn School and Sir George Monoux Grammar School
 Paul Di'Anno, lead singer of Iron Maiden 1978–1981.
 Alan Davies, stand-up comedian and regular guest on quiz show QI, was born in Chingford
 Curtis Davies, Premiership footballer
 Chris Day
 Eric Deakins
 Joe Dever, author and games designer, was born in Chingford in 1956
 Adam Devlin, guitarist for The Bluetones lives in Walthamstow

 Benjamin Disraeli, former British Prime Minister, attended Higham Hall School in Walthamstow
 John Drinkwater   
 Iain Duncan Smith, MP
 Ian Dury, singer and songwriter, studied at Walthamstow Art College
 Fleur East, singer-songwriter, runner-up to The X Factor UK, 2014
 East 17, British pop boy band, including singer/songwriter Brian Harvey
 Sir George Edwards (aviation), aircraft designer (Concorde) and industrialist was born in Hale End Road, Highams Park, on 9 July 1908.
 Eamon Everall, studied at Waltham Forest School of Art
 Ken Farnes
 Joanne Fenn
 Patrik Fitzgerald
 Marion Foale
 Quinton Fortune   
 James Foster (cricketer, born 1980)
 Samantha Fox
 Dwight Gayle
 Neil Gerrard, MP for Walthamstow
 Terry Gibson
 Sir Stephen Gomersall
 Graham Gooch 
 Jon Goodman
 Nickolas Grace
 Michael Grandage
 Peter Greenaway, CBE
 Mark Greenstreet
 Gunshot (British Hip hop group)
 Fitz Hall
 King Harold I 
 Steve Harris, founder and bass player of Iron Maiden
 Brian Harvey (musician) 
 Martin Hayes (footballer)
 Paul Hayes
 Darren Hayman
 Barry Hearn
 Don Henderson  
 Peter Hennessy, historian
 John Hewer "Captain Birdseye"
 Steve Hillage
 James Hilton   
 Sir Alfred Hitchcock 
 David Holdsworth
 Dean Holdsworth
 Helen Hollick
 Richard Holmes (military historian)
 Tom Hood, humourist and playwright, born at Lake House in 1835
 Sydney Horler
 Justin Hoyte
 Mick Hume, journalist
 Nasser Hussain, OBE
 Doug Insole, England cricketer
 Jonathan Ive, designed the iPod (all generations) iMac (all generations), iBook, Powerbook, MacBook and MacBook Pro, as well as the new iPhone
 Iron Maiden
 Derek Jacobi
 Harry Kane
 Tolga Kashif
 Colin Kazim-Richards
 Lena Kennedy
 The Kray twins, buried in Chingford cemetery
 Kwasi Kwarteng, Conservative Party politician
 Terry Lawless
 T E Lawrence
 Lethal Bizzle
 Leyton Buzzards
 John Lill
 Russell Lissack, from Bloc Party grew up in Chingford
 Natasha Little
 Valentine McEntee, 1st Baron McEntee
 Morell Mackenzie
 Bryan Magee
 Dominic McVey, Britain's youngest self-made millionaire
 Shazia Mirza
 George Allan Mitchell, VC
 Chris Moncrieff, political journalist
 George Monoux, Lord Mayor of the City of London, 1514
 Bobby Moore
 Tara Moran
 More Fire Crew
 Ian Morgan
 Roger Morgan

 William Morris
 Tony Mortimer
 Fabrice Muamba
 Frank Muir, writer and radio personality
 Jimmy Neighbour
 Grant Nelson, radio DJ, went to school in Chingford
 Peter Nicol, MBE
 Michael Nyman, composer and musicologist
 Ronnie O'Sullivan
 Cornelia Parker
 Grayson Perry, ceramicist and 2003 Turner Prize winner, has his studio in Walthamstow
 Mark Petchey
 Pascale Petit, poet, twice shortlisted for T.S. Eliot Prize, lives in Walthamstow
 Eddie Phillips
 Leslie Phillips, comedy star of the Carry On Films, lived in Chingford
 Sol Plaatje
 Fred Pontin, founder and managing director of Pontins holiday camps
 Ruth Rendell
 Lt.Col V.C. 'Dope' Richmond, designer of the R101
 Tony Robinson
 Alliot Verdon Roe
 Jonathan Ross   
 Paul Ross 
 Ken Russell
 Pam St. Clement
 Nick Saloman
 June Sarpong, television presenter
 Graham Saville
 Baroness Scotland, Attorney General, grew up in Walthamstow and attended Walthamstow School for Girls
 Jamie Shea
 Teddy Sheringham, footballer, born on 2 April 1966 in Highams Park
 Rita Simons, British actress, singer and model
 Talvin Singh
 John Smith, avant–garde filmmaker, born in Highams Park, attended Selwyn Avenue School and George Monoux School
 Rodney "Gypsy" Smith
 Vivian Stanshall, musician, painter, singer, broadcaster, songwriter, poet and writer, best known for his work with the Bonzo Dog Doo-Dah Band, grew up in Grove Road, Walthamstow
 Seán Mac Stíofáin
 Meera Syal
 Thomas Griffith Taylor (1890-1963), Antarctic explorer
 Norman Tebbit
 Nicola Walker
 Michelene Wandor
 Peter Waterfield, born in Walthamstow
 Angela Watkinson, MP
 Michael Watson
 Douglas Webb, Dam Buster and photographer
 Geoffrey Wellum
 Danniella Westbrook, former EastEnders star lives in Chingford
 Adam Woodyatt, English actor who plays Ian Beale in EastEnders, born in Walthamstow 1968
 Phil Woosnam
 Matthew Xia

References

Waltham Forest
People from the London Borough of Waltham Forest